Lillian Debra Watson (born July 11, 1950), commonly known by her nickname Pokey Watson, and later by her married name Lillian Richardson, is an American former competition swimmer, two-time Olympic champion, and former world record-holder in three events.

As a 14-year-old, she represented the United States at the 1964 Summer Olympics in Tokyo, Japan.  Watson won a gold medal as a member of the first-place U.S. team in the women's 4×100-meter freestyle relay, together with her teammates Sharon Stouder, Donna de Varona and Kathy Ellis.  The four American women set a new world of 4:03.8 in the event final.  She also swam the backstroke leg for the gold medal-winning U.S. team in the preliminary heats of the women's 4×100-meter medley relay, but did not receive a second medal because only relay swimmers who competed in the event final were eligible under the 1964 rules.  Four years later at the 1968 Summer Olympics in Mexico City, she won a gold medal for her first-place performance in the women's 200-meter backstroke, setting a new Olympic record of 2:24.8.

Watson broke Dawn Fraser's six-year-old world record in the 200-meter freestyle (long course) on August 19, 1966, with a time of 2:10.5, and held the record for one year.  She was part of several world record performances in relay events.

Watson was inducted into the International Swimming Hall of Fame as an "Honor Swimmer" in 1984.

See also
 List of Olympic medalists in swimming (women)
 List of University of California, Los Angeles people
 World record progression 200 metres freestyle
 World record progression 4 × 100 metres freestyle relay
 World record progression 4 × 100 metres medley relay

References

External links
 

1950 births
Living people
American female backstroke swimmers
American female freestyle swimmers
World record setters in swimming
Olympic gold medalists for the United States in swimming
People from Mineola, New York
Swimmers at the 1964 Summer Olympics
Swimmers at the 1967 Pan American Games
Swimmers at the 1968 Summer Olympics
University of California, Los Angeles alumni
Medalists at the 1968 Summer Olympics
Medalists at the 1964 Summer Olympics
Pan American Games bronze medalists for the United States
Pan American Games medalists in swimming
Medalists at the 1967 Pan American Games
21st-century American women